Ariels is the third studio album from the electronica band Bent, released October 12, 2004, through Open/Ministry of Sound. There is a stronger element of acoustic instruments present on the album than the previous releases, and the earlier extensive use of samples has been toned down.

Track listing
"Comin' Back" – 4:39
"Sunday 29th" – 4:09
"I Can't Believe It's Over" – 4:15
"As You Fall" – 3:35
"Silent Life" – 4:57
"Sing Me" – 5:15
"On The Lake" – 3:18
"Now I Must Remember" – 4:46
"You Are The Oscillator" – 3:48
"Sunday Boy" – 5:50
"Exercise 4" – 5:43
"The Waters Deep" – 8:30

Personnel

Simon Mills – Writer, producer, engineer, programmer
Neil Tolliday – Writer, producer, engineer, programmer 	
Katty Heath – Vocals
Sian Evans – Vocals
Rachel Foster – Vocals
Steve Edwards – Vocals
BJ Cole – Steel pedal, E-bow
|John Thompson – Fender bass, upright bass, guitar
Gareth Bailey – Brass, percussion
Paul Cole – Percussion, drums
Rhodri Davies – Harp
Dorian Conway – Flute
Arwel Hughes – Upright bass
Darrin Mooney – Drums
Gavin Wright – Violin
Julian Leaper – Violin
Bruce White – Viola
Dave Daniels - Cello

References

Bent (band) albums
2004 albums
Ministry of Sound albums